Pygoda variegata is a species of stink bug in the family Pentatomidae. It was first described in 2018 and is found in Costa Rica and Panamá. Its scientific name is in reference to the mix of brown, green and yellow of the body.

References

Pentatomidae
Insects described in 2018